The Forego Stakes is a Grade I American Thoroughbred horse race for horses four years old and older over the distance of seven furlongs on the dirt, scheduled annually in August at Saratoga Race Course in Saratoga Springs, New York.  The event currently carries a purse of $600,000.

History
This event is named for Forego, the American Horse of the Year for three straight years between 1974 and 1976.

The event was inaugurated on 27 August 1980, Opening Day of the Belmont Park Fall meeting for that year over a distance of one mile  with handicap conditions and was won by Tanthem who was ridden by United States' Racing Hall of Fame jockey Jorge Velásquez in a time of 1:35 flat.  The event was held at Belmont Park the following year but was moved in 1982 to Saratoga with a decrease in distance to seven furlongs.

In 1983 the event was classified as Grade III, and year after it was upgraded to Grade II.

From 2000 through 2002 the event was run at six and a half furlongs before reverting to the seven furlong distance in 2003.

In 2001, the event was upgraded to Grade I.

The event is considered a main preparatory race for either the Breeders' Cup Sprint at six furlongs, or the Breeders' Cup Dirt Mile. Several notable winners have followed such a path.

The 2020 and 2021 renewals were restricted to horses aged four years old and older.

Records
Time record:  
7 furlongs: 1:20.80 – Mitole (2019)

Margins:
8 lengths – Affirmed Success  (1998)

Most wins:
 2 – Groovy (1986, 1987)
 2 –  Quick Call  (1988, 1989)

Most wins by an owner:
 3 – Godolphin Racing (2009, 2012, 2022)

Most wins by a jockey:
 4 – Ángel Cordero Jr. (1981, 1983, 1985, 1987)

Most wins by a trainer:
 4 – Robert J. Frankel (2003, 2004, 2005, 2008)

Winners

See also
List of American and Canadian Graded races

References

Graded stakes races in the United States
Grade 1 stakes races in the United States
Horse races in New York (state)
Recurring sporting events established in 1980
Saratoga Race Course
1980 establishments in New York (state)